The Luxury Car Tax (LCT) is a tax within the Australian taxation system, collected by the Australian Taxation Office on behalf of the Australian Government. It began on 1 July 2001, having been brought in by the John Howard Coalition government.

Description
LCT is payable by businesses which sell or import luxury cars, unless the business's Australian Business Number (ABN) number is quoted in the correct format to the supplier or Customs. 

LCT is charged in addition to the Goods and Services Tax (GST), but it is not payable on the full price of the vehicle. LCT is only payable at the rate of 33% (up from 25% as of 1 July 2008, though no senate approval for this increase was obtained) of the value of the GST-inclusive value which exceeds the LCT threshold. The LCT threshold is currently $67,525.00 AUD (for the 2019-20 financial year). An increased threshold of $75,526.00 AUD applies to fuel efficient cars that have a combined fuel consumption rating not exceeding 7 litres per 100 kilometres (based on a combined test cycle rating under ADR81).

LCT is reported on an organisation's Business Activity Statement at labels 1E and 1F. An organisation is not required to complete the LCT section of their BAS when they have elected the GST Instalment Option as LCT is included in this amount. Organisations which report and pay GST annually are only required to report LCT on their annual GST return (GSTR)

Businesses are only permitted to quote their ABN when the vehicle is used for the following purposes:
Exporting the vehicle in circumstances where the export is GST-free
Conducting research or development for the vehicle's manufacturer
Holding the vehicle as trading stock (not including for rent or leasing purposes)

The LCT becomes due and payable when you on-sell the luxury car or stop using it for a quotable purpose. This might happen if you hold a car as trading stock and start using it for private purposes or if it becomes a capital asset of your business.

LCT statistics

Luxury Car Tax statistics can be found in the Taxation Office's publication Taxation Statistics.
 GST and other indirect taxes

Criticism 
There has been calls from the industry peak bodies such as the Federal Chamber of Automotive Industries (FCAI), the Australian Automotive Association (AAA) and the Australian Automotive Dealer Association (AADA) to abolish the tax.  They claim the tax was designed to protect local automobile manufacturing industry which no longer exist as the big three manufacturers Toyota, Ford and Holden ceased operations in the 2010s.

There has been a suggestion to increase the LCT threshold or give farmers exemption.

See also
 Taxation in Australia

References

External links 
Luxury car tax rate and thresholds
Luxury Car Tax (LCT) Calculator
Detailed Guide to Luxury Car Tax (LCT)

Taxation in Australia